
This is the filmography for Blanche Sweet.  According to the Internet Movie Database, Sweet appeared in 161 films between 1909 and 1959.

1909 - 1910 - 1911 - 1912 -  1913 - 1914 - 1915 - 1916 -  1917 - 1919 - Later films - References

1909

 A Man with Three Wives (lost)
 A Corner in Wheat
 In Little Italy 

 To Save Her Soul
 The Day After
 Choosing a Husband

1910

 The Rocky Road
 All on Account of the Milk
 A Romance of the Western Hills

 The Kid 
 A Flash of Light
 Love in Quarantine

1911

 The Two Paths
 Heart Beats of Long Ago 
 His Daughter 
 The Lily of the Tenements 
 A Decree of Destiny 
 Was He a Coward?
 The Lonedale Operator
 Priscilla's April Fool Joke 
 The Spanish Gypsy 
 Priscilla and the Umbrella 
 The Broken Cross 
 How She Triumphed (lost)
 The Country Lovers
 The New Dress 
 The White Rose of the Wilds 
 The Smile of a Child 
 Enoch Arden: Part I

 The Primal Call 
 Fighting Blood
 The Indian Brothers
 A Country Cupid
 The Last Drop of Water
 Out from the Shadow 
 The Blind Princess and the Poet 
 The Stuff Heroes Are Made Of 
 The Making of a Man 
 The Long Road 
 Love in the Hills 
 The Battle
 Through Darkened Vales
 The Miser's Heart
 A Woman Scorned
 The Voice of the Child

1912

 The Eternal Mother
 The Old Bookkeeper 
 For His Son
 The Transformation of Mike
 A Sister's Love 
 Under Burning Skies 
 A String of Pearls
 The Goddess of Sagebrush Gulch 
 The Punishment 
 One Is Business, the Other Crime
 The Lesser Evil
 An Outcast Among Outcasts 

 A Temporary Truce
 The Spirit Awakened 
 Man's Lust for Gold
 The Inner Circle
 With the Enemy's Help
 A Change of Spirit
 A Pueblo Romance 
 Blind Love 
 The Chief's Blanket 
 The Painted Lady
 A Sailor's Heart
 The God Within

1913

 Three Friends
 Pirate Gold
 Oil and Water
 A Chance Deception 
 Love in an Apartment Hotel 
 Broken Ways
 Near to Earth 
 The Hero of Little Italy 
 The Stolen Bride 
 If We Only Knew
 Death's Marathon

 The Mistake 
 The Coming of Angelo (lost)
 The Vengeance of Galora 
 Two Men of the Desert (lost)
 A Cure for Suffragettes
 The Battle at Elderbush Gulch
 The House of Discord
 Beyond All Law (lost)
 Her Wedding Bell (lost)
 The Wedding Gown

1914

 The Sentimental Sister (lost)
 Classmates
 The Massacre
 Judith of Bethulia
 Strongheart
 Brute Force
 Ashes of the Past (lost)
 Home, Sweet Home
 The Soul of Honor (lost)
 The Escape

 The Avenging Conscience: or 'Thou Shalt Not Kill'
 The Second Mrs. Roebuck (lost)
 Men and Women
 For Those Unborn (lost)
 Her Awakening (lost)
 For Her Father's Sins (lost)
 The Tear That Burned (lost)
 The Odalisque (lost)
 The Little Country Mouse
 The Old Maid (lost)

1915

 The Warrens of Virginia 
 His Desperate Deed (lost)
 The Captive
 Stolen Goods (lost)

 The Clue (lost)
 The Secret Orchard (lost)
 The Case of Becky 
 The Secret Sin

1916

 The Ragamuffin 
 The Blacklist (lost)
 The Sowers 
 The Thousand-Dollar Husband (lost)

 The Dupe (lost)
 Public Opinion 
 The Storm
 Unprotected (lost)

1917

 The Evil Eye 
 Those Without Sin (lost)

 The Tides of Barnegat (lost)
 The Silent Partner

1919

 The Unpardonable Sin 
 The Hushed Hour 

 A Woman of Pleasure 
 Fighting Cressy (lost)

Later films

 The Deadlier Sex (1920) 
 Simple Souls (1920) 
 The Girl in the Web (Lost, 1920) 
 Help Wanted – Male (Lost, 1920)
 Her Unwilling Husband (Lost, 1920)
 That Girl Montana (1921) 
 Quincy Adams Sawyer (Lost, 1922)
 The Meanest Man in the World (fragment, 1923)
 In the Palace of the King (1923) 
 Anna Christie (1923) 
 Those Who Dance (1924) 
 Tess of the d'Urbervilles (Lost, 1924)
 The Sporting Venus (1925) 
 His Supreme Moment (Lost, 1925) 

 Why Women Love (Lost, 1925)
 The New Commandment (Lost, 1925)
 Bluebeard's Seven Wives (Lost, 1925)
 The Lady from Hell (Extant (New Zealand), 1926)
 The Far Cry (Lost, 1926)
 Diplomacy (1926) 
 Singed (1927)
 The Woman in White (1929, Lost)
 Always Faithful (1929) 
 The Woman Racket (1930)
 Showgirl in Hollywood (1930) 
 The Silver Horde (1930) 
 The Five Pennies (1959)

References

Actress filmographies
American filmographies